Altınova is a town and district of Yalova Province, Turkey.

Altınova (literally "golden plains" in Turkish) may refer to:

 Altınova, Elazığ, an important archaeological site in the Altınova plain of the Elazığ Province
 Altınova, Ayvalık, a village in the district of Ayvalık, Balıkesir Province
 Altınova, Evciler, a village in the district of Evciler, Afyonkarahisar Province
 Altınova, Çine, a village in the district of Çine, Aydın Province
 Altınova, Karaisalı, a village in the district of Karaisalı, Adana Province
 Altınova, Tavas

It may also refer to:

 Altınova, Cyprus, a village in north-eastern Cyprus, better known by its Greek name, Agios Iakovos